Garden Valley, California may refer to:
 Garden Valley, El Dorado County, California
 Garden Valley, Yuba County, California